This Is the Year is a 2020 American teen comedy-drama film directed by David Henrie, starring Lorenzo James Henrie, Vanessa Marano, Alyssa Jirrels, Bug Hall, Jake Short, Jeff Garlin, and Gregg Sulkin. It is Henrie's feature film directorial debut and Selena Gomez serves as an executive producer.

The film had a live virtual premiere on August 28, 2020. It was released in select theaters in the United States and through video on demand on September 24, 2021, by Vertical Entertainment.

Plot
In a last-ditch effort to win over the girl of his dreams, a nerdy high school senior and his best friends embark on a road trip to see their favorite band at the biggest music festival of the year, only to discover true love in the most unexpected place.

Cast
 Lorenzo James Henrie as Josh
 Boston Pierce as Young Josh
 Vanessa Marano as Molly
 Gregg Sulkin as Kale
 Jeff Garlin as Mr. Elmer
 Alyssa Jirrels as Zoey
 Bug Hall as Donnie
 Jake Short as Mikey
 David Henrie as Sebastian
 Gregg Christie as Luca
 Kate Katzman as Sofia
 Josh Rhett Noble as Homeless Jared

References

External links
 

2020 films
2020 comedy-drama films
2020 directorial debut films
2020s coming-of-age comedy-drama films
2020s high school films
2020s road comedy-drama films
2020s teen comedy-drama films
American coming-of-age comedy-drama films
American high school films
American road comedy-drama films
American teen comedy-drama films
Films directed by David Henrie
Vertical Entertainment films
2020s English-language films
2020s American films